Ceal Floyer (born 1968) is a Pakistani-born British visual artist. She is based in Berlin, Germany.

Biography
Floyer was born in 1968 in Karachi, Pakistan. Floyer received a BFA degree from Goldsmiths College, in 1994. While studying, Floyer worked as a gallery invigilator. 

In 1997 she relocated to Berlin to study at the Künstlerhaus Bethanien. The same year she won the Philip Morris Prize. In 2007, she won the National Gallery Prize for Young Art, and in 2009 she won the Nam June Paik Art Center Prize.

In 2008 she exhibited ... 5 minutes later at the Kunst-Werke Institute for Contemporary Art and has exhibited continuously since then. Her work are in the collections of the Tate, the San Francisco Museum of Modern Art, and MoMA.

Style
Floyer consistently engages the discourse surrounding conceptual art, minimalism, post-minimalism, the ready-made and technology within her work.  Her work is often remarked upon for its visual austerity that stands in stark contrast to the abundant verbal implications and how it precipitates greater conjecture. For example, her work Bucket (1999) is a black bucket accompanied by the sound of a leak. However, if you look closely, there is a CD player inside the bucket, emitting the sound of the leak. Similarly, Matches (2010) is an artwork that places three boxes of matches on a shelf, a pun on whether or not they different boxes of matches "match".  In a catalogue essay for her exhibition at the Kunsthalle Bern in 1999, Berhard Fibicher wrote:

"Both Carousel and Bucket function like classical metaphors -- albeit not on a linguistic level (although the titles are often crucial to deciphering Ceal Floyer's picture puzzles), but at that of sensorial perception.  The metaphor operates by conflating the distance between two objects, by revealing their similarity.  Surprising similarities make us seek the characteristics shared by various objects.  Ceal Floyer instrumentalises the distance between objects, or between the object and its name, reducing that distance so much by way of revealing similarity, that one object may become identical with another, or with its name".

Publications
Ceal Floyer. Exhibition catalogue. Ikon Gallery, Birmingham, UK 2002
Ceal Floyer. Exhibition catalogue. X-rummet, Statens Museum for Kunst, Copenhagen, 2002
Ceal Floyer. Exhibition catalogue. Contemporary Art Gallery, Vancouver, 2005
Ceal Floyer: Construction. Exhibition catalogue. Kunstmuseen Krefeld, 2007
Auto Focus. Exhibition catalogue. Museum of Contemporary Art, North Miami, 2010
Works on Paper. Exhibition catalogue. Center for Contemporary Art, Tel Aviv, 2011
Ceal Floyer. Exhibition catalogue. Kölnischer Kunstverein, 2013
Ceal Floyer. Exhibition catalogue. Museion Bolzano, 2014
Ceal Floyer. A Handbook. Exhibition catalogue. Kunstmuseum Bonn and Aargauer Kunsthaus, 2015

References

External links
Images of Floyer's work from Lisson Gallery

1968 births
Living people
20th-century British women artists
21st-century British women artists
Alumni of Goldsmiths, University of London
English contemporary artists
Women conceptual artists